Night Vision is the fourth studio album by Canadian singer-songwriter Bruce Cockburn released domestically on True North Records. The album earned Cockburn's first Canadian gold record award in 1979. It was the first full album that Cockburn recorded with a band. The album's artwork is an adaptation of a painting by Alex Colville entitled "Horse and Train".

Reception

AllMusic music critic James Chrispell, wrote retrospectively "A little darker this time out (hence the title), Bruce Cockburn's fourth album find even greater rewards... No matter what type of music you're looking for, there's something here that will tickle your fancy."

Track listing 

All songs by Bruce Cockburn

 "Foxglove" – 1:29
 "You Don't Have to Play the Horses" – 3:49
 "The Blues Got the World..." – 1:52
 "Mama Just Wants to Barrelhouse All Night Long" – 4:14
 "Islands in a Black Sky" – 7:40
 "Clocks Don't Bring Tomorrow – Knives Don't Bring Good News" – 6:49
 "When the Sun Goes Nova" – 2:42
 "Déjà Vu" – 5:36
 "Light Storm" – 2:33
 "God Bless the Children" – 4:17

Personnel 

 Bruce Cockburn – vocals, guitar 
 Pat Godfrey – piano
 Dennis Pendrith – bass
 John Savage – drums

References 

1973 albums
Bruce Cockburn albums
Albums produced by Gene Martynec
True North Records albums
Columbia Records albums